Launceston may refer to:

Places
 Launceston, Cornwall, a town, ancient borough, and civil parish in Cornwall, England, United Kingdom
 Launceston (UK Parliament constituency), a former parliamentary constituency in Cornwall
 Launceston, Tasmania, a city in the north of Tasmania, Australia
 City of Launceston (also Launceston City Council), a local government body in Tasmania
 Launceston Airport, a regional airport on the outskirts of Launceston, Tasmania
 Tarrant Launceston, a small village and civil parish in north Dorset, England

Ships
 , an Armidale-class patrol boat of the Royal Australian Navy
 , a Fremantle-class patrol boat of the Royal Australian Navy
 , one of 60 Bathurst-class corvettes constructed during World War II

Other
 Launceston Elliot (1874–1930), a Scottish weightlifter
 Launceston Rugby Club, a Cornish rugby club who play at Polson Bridge, Launceston, Cornwall
 Viscount Launceston, a peerage title